Súper Estrella was a Honduran football club, based in Danlí, Honduras.  The club played in the Honduran Liga Nacional for four seasons from 1989 to 1991.

History
Súper Estrella obtained promotion to Liga Nacional on December 1988 as winners of the 1988 Honduran Segunda División.  They became the first team to represent El Paraíso Department in the top division where they played four consecutive years from 1989–90 to 1992–93.  However, they didn't make a big impact.  The club owns the negative record of being the only team in league's history of spending a whole season without a single victory.  This happened in 1992–93 with a 0–6–21 record, resulting in the team's relegation to Segunda División.

Achievements
Segunda División
Winners (1): 1988
Ascenso 1B 1986
Ascenso 1A 1987

League performance

References

Football clubs in Honduras